Abraham J. Siegel (November 6, 1922 - January 16, 2011) was Dean (from 1980 to 1987), and later Howard W. Johnson Professor of Management Emeritus in the MIT Sloan School of Management.

References

2011 deaths
MIT Sloan School of Management faculty
1922 births